Reisner is a surname of Germanic origin and may refer to:

Charles Reisner (1887–1952), American actor and film director
George Andrew Reisner (1867–1942), American archaeologist
Reisner Papyrus, four 19th century BCE papyri discovered by Reisner
Marc Reisner (1948–2000), American environmentalist
Hermann E. Reisner (1910–2002), German entrepreneur, publisher and author

See also
Hans Reissner (1874–1967), German aeronautical engineer